Kenja Chethan Kumar, is an Indian film Director, Writer and an Editor known for his works in Kannada Films and Television shows.

Early life and education 
Kenja Chethan Kumar was born in Kenja village in the Udupi district of Karnataka. He hails from an agricultural family. His parents are into agriculture.

His grandfather, late Kemthur Doddanna Shetty was a playwright, actor, singer and a director who wrote plays in the Tulu language. One of his plays was staged 6666 times. In his childhood, Kenja came across an article about his grandfather which inspired him to start writing plays. He wrote his first play when he was only 12 years old. 

He did his schooling in a Kannada medium school, Nithya Sahaya Hiriya Prathamika Shaale, Irandadi and completed his high school from Vidya Nagar Govt. High School in Mudarangadi. Due to financial problems at home he joined Besant Evening College, Kodailbail in Mangaluru as he could study in the evening while working in several jobs during the day. 

During his high school days he noticed that most of the audience preferred films over plays and Kenja realized that his own interests had begun shifting towards films. Around the same time he watched a movie directed by the well known Kannada actor Updendra and that was when he decided to pursue a career in film direction. 

Kenja came to Bengaluru to work towards film direction, during which he came across an Interview of the Indian filmmaker Rajkumar Hirani where he talks about being an Editor and that it helped his career as a film director. As one can learn a lot from the editing table. That is when Kenja took a few courses on Editing after which he worked in some well known TV channels like Asianet Suvarna, TV9 Kannada, Star India Pvt Ltd. During the course of his work he acquired technical skills like DI, Stereo 3D, graphic software and gained some more knowledge on shooting and post production. He worked as a full time video editor for approximately 7 years before quitting his job to pursue his own direction ventures.

Career

Early work 
Kenja Chethan Kumar has worked in television channels as a video editor with Asianet Suvarna and TV9 in Karnataka, Star India Private Limited, Mumbai. He has done freelance work with Bigg Boss kannada, Family power, Dancing star and a few other popular shows.

He has also worked as an Editor and assistant director on a few movies. He has worked as an editor with a Bollywood venture, a music album and a Sandalwood film.

The short film, Traffic signal was officially his first project that was written, edited and directed by him.

Kenja was also supposed to direct the Tulu film Katapadi Kattapa but he had to then back out of it due to the delay of the shoot that had resulted in his dates overlapping with another project.

Television work as a full time Editor

Other Freelance work as an Editor

Directorial debut 
In 2016, Kenja made his directional debut with the soft romantic comedy film, Prema Geema Jaane Do starring Gowtham Ghatke, Sheetal Shetty, Pallavi Gowda, Ramesh Bhat and Mandeep Roy. The music was scored by Poornachandra Tejaswi, and lyrics written by Arasu Anthare. 

in 2019, Kenja directed his second film, titled Devaru Bekagiddare starring Master Anoop, Sathyanath, Prasad Vasista and the veteran actor Shivaram. It was about the journey of an innocent boy who decides to find his estranged parents after dealing with the loss of his foster father. The child actor of this film, Master Anoop was nominated in the Chandanavana Film Critics Academy Awards 2020 for the best child actor category.

Filmography

References

External links 

 
 Kenja Chethan Kumar on Book My Show

Indian film directors
Kannada film directors
Year of birth missing (living people)
Living people